Erminio Bolzan (11 March 1914 – 26 January 1993) was an Italian boxer who competed in the 1936 Summer Olympics. In 1936 he was eliminated in the second round of the light heavyweight class after losing his fight to the upcoming silver medalist Richard Vogt.

References

External links
 

1914 births
1993 deaths
Light-heavyweight boxers
Olympic boxers of Italy
Boxers at the 1936 Summer Olympics
Italian male boxers